Hamburg is an unincorporated community in Siskiyou County, California, United States.

Climate

Hamburg has a Hot-summer Mediterranean climate, abbreviated (Köppen Csa) that is characterized by hot and dry summers, and cold, chilly rainy and snowy winters. In Hamburgs's case the city experiences much warmer summers than locations near the coast such as county seat Yreka, but retains high winter rainfall associated with coastal locations. Daytime highs in summer are representative for areas with hot-summer-mediterranean climates, but is moderated by cool nights, causing high diurnal temperature variation.

Hamburg on average has wet winters and dry summers, also representative for the region. Temperatures of above  are usual in summertimes, happening frequently.

This region experiences much warmer summers than locations near the coast such as Eureka, but retains high winter rainfall associated with coastal locations. Daytime highs in summer are representative for areas with hot-summer-mediterranean climates, but is moderated by cool nights, causing high diurnal temperature variation.

Summer highs are extremely hot when compared to areas that are affected by coastal fog.

References

Unincorporated communities in California
Unincorporated communities in Siskiyou County, California